Saint Ignatius' Church is a Roman Catholic church situated at the Illuminated Block, in Buenos Aires's neighbourhood of Montserrat. The first building, which was made of adobe, was built by the Society of Jesus in 1675. The southern tower and the present facade were built in 1686, and the rest of the Church construction started in 1712. Today's church was completed in 1722 and consecrated in 1734.

Saint Ignatius is the oldest church preserved in Buenos Aires, and was declared a National Historic Monument in 1942. On June 16, 1955, during a government campaign against the Church, after a failed revolution against Juan Domingo Perón's government, Peronist mobs burnt most churches of Buenos Aires, including Saint Ignatius.

Gallery

See also
 List of Jesuit sites
 List of tallest structures built before the 20th century

References

External links
 San Ignacio de Loyola 

Roman Catholic churches in Buenos Aires
Roman Catholic churches completed in 1722
18th-century Roman Catholic church buildings in Argentina
1722 establishments in the Spanish Empire
Baroque church buildings in Argentina